"Brand New Day" is a song by British musician Sting, the title track of his sixth studio album (1999). The song features Stevie Wonder on harmonica. It was released as a single on 13 September 1999, peaking at number 13 in the United Kingdom and reaching the top 40 on two Canadian charts. In the United States, it peaked at number three on the Billboard Bubbling Under Hot 100 and won a Grammy Award for Best Male Pop Vocal Performance in 2000.

1999 CD singles
Sources:

A-side
 "Brand New Day (Edit)" – 3:59

B-sides
 "Brand New Day" – 6:20
 "Fields of Gold" – 3:40
 "Englishman in New York" – 4:25

1999 maxi-CD single
Source:

A-side
 "Brand New Day" (Edit)	– 4:07

B-sides
 "Windmills of Your Mind" – 4:19
 "End of the Game" – 6:36
 "Brand New Day" – 6:20

2019 version
On 31 December 2018 (New Year's Eve), Sting freely released "Brand New Day 2019", a new version of the song, through his Facebook page. The song was first performed live in Times Square on the same day.

Charts

References

External links
 

1999 singles
1999 songs
A&M Records singles
Grammy Award for Best Male Pop Vocal Performance
Sting (musician) songs
Songs written by Sting (musician)